Dmytro Romanenko (born 1 May 1980) is a Ukrainian former professional football defender.

Career
Dmytro Romanenko started his football career in his native club Desna Chernihiv. He also performed at their farm team Slavutych-ChNPP. In early 1999, he accepted an invitation from Dynamo Kyiv, but played only in the second and third teams of Dynamo. Later he moved to Hoverla Uzhhorod, and then to Naftovyk Okhtyrka. In 2004 he returned to Desna Chernihiv. In the winter of 2005 he became a player of Alchevsk "Steel", which played in the Ukrainian Premier League. Then I passed to Mykolaiv. 2008 began as part of the amateur club Desna-2 Chernihiv. Then he played 1 match in the shirt of the second league Kyiv Arsenal-Kyivshchyna. After that he played at the amateur level for "Polissya" (Dobryanka), "Budivel-Energiya" (Ripky), "Avangard" (Koryukivka) and Avers Bakhmach.

References

External links
 footballfacts.ru

1980 births
Living people
Footballers from Chernihiv
Ukrainian footballers
FC Desna Chernihiv players
FC Desna-2 Chernihiv players
FC Dynamo-2 Kyiv players
FC Dynamo-3 Kyiv players
FC Slavutych players
FC Hoverla Uzhhorod players
FC Naftovyk-Ukrnafta Okhtyrka players
FC Stal Alchevsk players
MFC Mykolaiv players
FC Arsenal-Kyivshchyna Bila Tserkva players
FC Avanhard Koriukivka players
Ukrainian Second League players
Association football defenders